The women's skeet competition at the 2006 Asian Games in Doha, Qatar was held on 7 December at the Lusail Shooting Range.

Schedule
All times are Arabia Standard Time (UTC+03:00)

Records

Results

Qualification

Final

References

ISSF Results Overview
Qualification Results
Final Results

External links
Official website

Women Shotgun S